Bianca Weech is a German football goalkeeper, currently playing for Hamburger SV in the Frauen Bundesliga.

References

1984 births
Living people
German women's footballers
Hamburger SV (women) players
Women's association football goalkeepers